NCAA Season 88 is the 2012–13 season of the National Collegiate Athletic Association (NCAA). The host school, Colegio de San Juan de Letran, will lead the opening ceremonies at the Smart Araneta Coliseum on June 23, 2012. TV5, via its Sports5 production, will air the men's basketball tournament at AKTV on IBC, its first year of airing the league. With its new TV contract, the league was allowed to schedule Saturday games; on its old TV coverage partner ABS-CBN, no weekend games were scheduled.

Basketball

Seniors' tournament

Elimination round

Playoffs

Juniors' tournament

Elimination round

Playoffs

See also
UAAP Season 75

References

External links
Official website

2012 in multi-sport events
2013 in multi-sport events
2012 in Philippine sport
2013 in Philippine sport
87